Tetropismenus hirtus is a species of ulidiid or picture-winged fly in the genus Tetropismenus of the family Ulidiidae.

References

Otitinae